The 1894 Wisbech by-election was held on 3 April 1894 after the incumbent Liberal MP, Arthur Brand was appointed as Treasurer of the Household.  The seat was retained won by Brand, although he would lose the seat again in the next year's general election.

References

By-elections to the Parliament of the United Kingdom in Cambridgeshire constituencies
Ministerial by-elections to the Parliament of the United Kingdom
1894 elections in the United Kingdom
1894 in England
19th century in Cambridgeshire
April 1894 events